Cumberland is an unincorporated community in King County, Washington. Originally a mining camp, Cumberland was named by F.X. Schreiner in 1893 after the Cumberland coal region of the Appalachian Mountains.  Cumberland gained a post office on October 13, 1894. Today, the Enumclaw post office serves this area. Although many other mining camps in the area have disappeared, Cumberland can still be found in the Cascade foothills between Nolte State Park and Kanaskat-Palmer State Park. It is accessible via Southeast King County backroads.

Cumberland is within the KCFD #28 fire department service area, also known as the Enumclaw Fire Department, which is a combined paid and volunteer service.  It is a King County registered voting precinct.

Following grassroots community protest and objections from the Muckleshoot Native American tribe (who are downriver on the nearby Green River), the county agreed to create an Environmental impact statement (EIS). The EIS showed a number of toxins present in the sludge, and the project was officially cancelled in 1992.

References

Unincorporated communities in King County, Washington
Unincorporated communities in Washington (state)